House of Fury is a 2005 Hong Kong martial arts comedy film written and directed by Stephen Fung, who also co-stars in the film, and executive produced by Jackie Chan. The film stars Anthony Wong, Michael Wong and Gillian Chung. The film was released in the Hong Kong on 24 March 2005. House of Fury features a collaboration between Anthony Wong and Michael Wong, reuniting them for the first time since 1998's Beast Cops.

Plot
Terry Yue Siu-bo, a single father who single-handedly raises his two children, Natalie and Nicky, to young adulthood after his wife's death. Nicky works as a dolphin trainer at Ocean Park and Natalie goes to school with Ella, Nicky's girlfriend. Natalie's boyfriend, Jason, is a musician who does not speak Cantonese very well and, in his first scene, gives Natalie a pet pig. Siu-bo works as a Chinese traditional bonesetter and has kung fu skills, which he has passed on to his children, who display prowess while fighting each other in sibling disputes. Siu-bo tells exaggerated stories to his children and their friends, but they do not believe him.

Rocco, a wheelchair-using ex-CIA Agent out for revenge, kidnaps Siu-bo and demands information about a former spy whom Siu-bo knew. Siu-bo refuses to tell him, and Rocco threatens to harm his children if he does not give in. During this time, Uncle Chiu discovers Siu-bo's shop trashed and calls up Nicky to tell him of his father's disappearance. Finding a secret room at the back of his shop, Nicky finds out about his father's past as a G4 agent assigned to protect former spies.

Meanwhile, Siu-bo is injected with a truth serum by Rocco's men, and in his degraded mental state he reveals that he hid memory cards containing data about former spies in the lucky charms of his children. Rocco sends agents to Natalie, who is acting in a play, but Nicky manages to get to her and escape with some help from Ella and Jason.

As they hide out in Jason's house, Natalie finds out about the memory card in her charm and has Jason try to open it. They then find out that Natalie's card needs the other memory card to function, but Nicky in his haste to left it in his locker at the park. Nicky and Natalie then attempt to get it during the dead of night, but are intercepted by two of Rocco's minions. After defeating the minions, a phone rings, and they get into direct contact with Rocco, who threatens their father's death if they do not help him in his quest for revenge. Rocco gives gives them one day to find the agent from his past.

Nicky and Natalie get back to Jason's house and find out that they require voice authentication from their father to access the file. Jason works through the night to create a file that would match Siu-bo's voice. During this time Siu-bo attempts to escape, but is foiled by Rocco's son, who is extremely adept with a bo staff. Jason finishes the file, and is finally able to access the database. They find out that Rocco's target is actually Uncle Chiu, who turns out to be the same agent that left Rocco paralyzed and captured him. Nicky and Natalie try to leave to recover their father and find Uncle Chiu, but Jason traps them in his studio, and reveals that he is Siu-bo's co-agent and does not want them to get hurt. He also reveals that his romantic intentions with Natalie are real, and not just a cover story.

Jason makes his way to Uncle Chiu with a plan to relocate him, which the old Uncle seemingly accepts, asking for a final moment to spend with his granddaughter. However, Uncle Chiu then attempts to escape from Jason by climbing and running across rooftops. Meanwhile, the siblings manage to find an air vent to escape from Jason's trap, and follow Jason to Uncle Chiu's restaurant. Jason chases Uncle Chiu, but injures his ankle while attempting to jump between buildings and is barely saved from falling to his death by a fire hose thrown out by Uncle Chiu. Nicky and Natalie catch up to Uncle Chiu, and ask him for help in saving their father. He relents, and Jason calls Nicky to throw him his car's keys, so they could get Uncle Chiu to Rocco in time.

Nicky and Natalie take a boat to Rocco's lair, and demand to see their father. Rocco reveals him to be trapped in a tank rapidly emptying of air, and rebuffs them without the agent he is looking for. Uncle Chiu shows up, and Rocco calls in his men to kill them. They fight their way through everyone, with Natalie breaking out Siu-bo and Nicky saving Uncle Chiu from a killing blow and defeating Rocco's son. Nicky leaves Rocco unharmed after he makes him fall off his wheelchair, and everyone manages to leave Rocco's lair alive. In the ending scene, Jason comes to Siu-bo's home to apologize to Natalie, which she accepts. Nicky finally gets the courage to have a French kiss with Ella, and Siu-bo and Uncle Chiu play a game of chess, with Chiu's granddaughter watching.

Cast
Anthony Wong – Terry Yue Siu-bo
Stephen Fung – Nicky Yue
Gillian Chung – Natalie Yue
Charlene Choi – Ella
Daniel Wu – Jason
Michael Wong – Rocco
Josie Ho – GJ (Rocco's fighter)
Wu Ma – Uncle Chiu
Winnie Leung Man-yee – Tank
Jon Foo – John (Rocco's fighter)
Philip Ng – King (Rocco's fighter)
Jake Strickland – Nelson (Rocco's son)
 Chen Hu – Tiger (Rocco's fighter)
Lee Ka-ting – Tortured Man
Dick Tung Wai-keung – Headmaster
Yau Chi-wang – Young Nicky
Law Kar-ying – Cab Driver
Yuen Man-jun – Teacher
Chan Siu-gwan – Edward (Rocco's fighter)
Jason Tobin – Rocco's fighter
Higuchi Asuka – Rocco's fighter
Lo Po-shan – Rocco's fighter
Victy Wong Yin-keung – Rocco's fighter
Mak Hon-gei – Rocco's fighter
Chan Siu-wah – Rocco's fighter
Wong Wai-fai – Rocco's fighter
Yee Tin-hung – Rocco's fighter
Wong Kim-ban – Rocco's fighter

Release & Reception
On 22 June 2009, DVD was released by Cine Asia in a two-disc ultimate edition at the United Kingdom in Region 2.

In the review at Blu-Ray.com, Svet Atanasov criticized the film for its "awkward" combination of comedy and serious action scenes, but praised Anthony Wong's performance and remarked that the film is "watchable, I would say even entertaining".

References

External links
 
 
 Review by www.lovehkfilm.com

2005 films
2005 action comedy films
2005 martial arts films
Cantonese-language films
Films directed by Stephen Fung
Films set in Hong Kong
Hong Kong action comedy films
Hong Kong martial arts films
Kung fu films
Martial arts comedy films
2005 comedy films
2000s Hong Kong films